Phunky Phantom is electronic and dance music producer Laurence Nelson-Boudville, who was born in Brooklyn, New York.

Biography
His one U.S. chart entry came in 1997, when he hit #1 on the Hot Dance Club Play chart with the song "Get Up, Stand Up". The same track reached #27 in the UK Singles Chart in May 1998.

See also
Gat Decor
List of number-one dance hits (United States)
List of artists who reached number one on the US Dance chart

References

American dance musicians
American electronic musicians
American house musicians
Living people
Year of birth missing (living people)